Adriano Galliani (born 30 July 1944) is an Italian entrepreneur and football executive who is the CEO of  club Monza.

He is known for being former vice-chairman and CEO of AC Milan from 1986 to 2017, a period in the club's history known as the "Silvio Berlusconi era". During his tenure, Milan won five UEFA Champions League and eight Serie A titles among other achievements.

Career

AC Milan 
On 24 March 1986, Galliani became the managing director of Italian football club AC Milan; subsequently, he was also appointed deputy vice president.

In 1991, as Milan was playing Marseille in Stade Vélodrome at the 1990–91 European Cup, the lights went out in the 87th minute. The lights came back after 15 minutes, but Galliani refused to bring back the team on the pitch, citing concerns about the match being disrupted by TV crews storming the field. Milan was subsequently eliminated from the competition and barred from UEFA competitions for one year, and Galliani himself was suspended from all official functions until July 1993.

In 2002, Galliani became president of the Lega Nazionale Professionisti, and maintained this position during his tenure as Milan president.

From 21 December 2004 to 15 June 2006, he assumed the duties of deputy vice president of Milan following the resignation of Silvio Berlusconi, who was unable to hold the post due to a law governing conflict of interest; at the time, Berlusconi was president of the Council of Ministers of Italy. He held the office again from 8 May 2008 to 13 April 2017.

On 13 April 2017, with the sale of the rossoneri by Fininvest to Rossoneri Sport Investment Lux, Galliani officially ended his career in Milan in which, as CEO, he won 29 trophies in 31 years.

Monza 
In 2018, Galliani became CEO of Monza, a football club from his native town owned by Silvio Berlusconi. In January 2019, he made headlines for completing a total of 30 transfers in just one month.

On 29 May 2022, after beating Pisa in the Serie B promotion play-offs final, Monza secured their first-ever promotion to Serie A.

On 17 November 2022, Galliani's career was recognised with an Executive Career Award at the 2022 Globe Soccer Awards.

Personal life 
In 2011, Galliani was inducted into the Italian Football Hall of Fame. In April 2016, Galliani was one of the prominent Italian individuals to be named in the Panama Papers leak.

Galliani's grandson, Adrian, is a footballer.

References

External links 

 Interview at lamescolanza.com 
 Profile at magliarossonera.it 

1944 births
Living people
Sportspeople from Monza
Italian sports executives and administrators
A.C. Milan directors
People involved in the 2006 Italian football scandal
People named in the Panama Papers
People from Brianza
20th-century Italian businesspeople
21st-century Italian businesspeople
Forza Italia (2013) senators